Ridgefield is a city in northern Clark County, Washington, United States. The population was 10,319 at the time of the 2020 census, up from 4,763 in 2010, making it the fastest growing city in the state of Washington.

Located within the Portland metropolitan area, Ridgefield is notable for the significant Native American history and connection to the Lewis and Clark Expedition. It is also the headquarters of the Ridgefield National Wildlife Refuge, a primary reserve for migrating waterfowl on the Pacific Flyway, and the home of the Ridgefield High School "Spudders" (reflecting the area's potato-farming heritage).

History
The area has important ties to the Lewis and Clark Expedition of 1804–1806, being close to the Chinookan town of Cathlapotle, then a settlement of 700–800 people, with at least 14 substantial plank houses. The community's ties to the Chinookan people was commemorated by the construction of a replica of a Cathlapotle plank house at the nearby Ridgefield National Wildlife Refuge, which was dedicated March 29, 2005.

The town was formerly known as Union Ridge, named by the many Union veterans among the first large wave of settlers after the Civil War and was renamed Ridgefield in 1890. The town's original name is preserved in the name of Union Ridge Elementary School.

Ridgefield was an important trading center as early as the 1860s with its key location near the mouth of the Columbia River, and the city was officially incorporated on August 26, 1909. U-Haul, an American equipment rental company, had its start in Ridgefield in 1945.

Geography

Parks in Ridgefield include Abrams Park, Community Park, Davis Park, and Overlook Park. The Ridgefield Veterans Memorial is adjacent to Community Park.

Government
Ridgefield has a council–manager form of government, with a city manager who is appointed by a city council with seven elected members. The city council also selects a mayor from among themselves. The current city manager is Steve Stuart, a former county commissioner who was hired in 2014. Jennifer Lindsay has served as mayor since 2022, replacing Don Stose.

Economy
Rental and storage company U-Haul was founded in Ridgefield in 1945.

Demographics

2020 census
As of the census of 2020, there were 10,319 people and 2,899 households in the city. The racial makeup of the city was 81.5% White, 1.05% African American, 0.68% Native American, 3.48% Asian, 0.32% Pacific Islander, 2.7% from other races, and 10.27% from two or more races. Hispanic or Latino of any race were 8.14%.

Of the 2,899 households, 70.9% were married couples living together, 14.7% had a female householder with no husband present, and 8.6% had a male householder with no wife present. The average family size was 3.48.

The median age was 34.4 years. 7.3% were under the age of 5; 31.2% of residents were under the age of 18; 68.8% were 18 or over; and 10.7% were 65 or older.

As of 2021, the median household annual income was $107,861. The per capita income for the city was $41,214. About 3.1% of the population was below the poverty line.

2010 census
As of the census of 2010, there were 4,763 people, 1,591 households, and 1,258 families living in the city. The racial makeup of the city was 92.4% White, 0.9% African American, 0.8% Native American, 2.0% Asian, 0.1% Pacific Islander, 0.9% from other races, and 2.8% from two or more races. Hispanic or Latino of any race were 5.1%.

Of the 1,591 households, 48.1% had children under the age of 18 living with them, 62.0% were married couples living together, 11.6% had a female householder with no husband present, 5.5% had a male householder with no wife present, and 20.9% were non-families. 16.2% of households were one person and 6.1% were one person aged 65 or older. The average household size was 2.99 and the average family size was 3.34.

The median age was 32.4 years. 33.5% of residents were under the age of 18; 6.2% were between the ages of 18 and 24; 29.7% were from 25 to 44; 22.9% were from 45 to 64; and 7.7% were 65 or older. The gender makeup of the city was 49.9% male and 50.1% female.

2000 census
As of the census of 2000, there were 2,147 people, 739 households, and 557 families living in the city. The population density was 420.8 people per square mile (162.5/km). There were 777 housing units at an average density of 152.3 per square mile (58.8/km). The racial makeup of the city was 95.16% White, 0.28% African American, 1.12% Native American, 0.70% Asian, 0.05% Pacific Islander, 0.23% from other races, and 2.47% from two or more races. Hispanic or Latino of any race were 1.77% of the population. 20.4% were of German, 18.9% American, 11.9% English, 6.9% Irish and 6.2% Norwegian ancestry.

Of the 739 households, 43.8% had children under the age of 18 living with them, 58.6% were married couples living together, 11.8% had a female householder with no husband present, and 24.6% were non-families. 18.8% of households were one person and 8.0% were one person aged 65 or older. The average household size was 2.82 and the average family size was 3.18.

The age distribution was 29.8% under the age of 18, 7.6% from 18 to 24, 29.6% from 25 to 44, 22.4% from 45 to 64, and 10.7% 65 or older. The median age was 36 years. For every 100 females, there were 98.1 males. For every 100 females age 18 and over, there were 94.8 males.

The median household income was $46,012 and the median family income was $51,121. Males had a median income of $38,125 versus $27,426 for females. The per capita income for the city was $21,696. About 4.4% of families and 6.3% of the population were below the poverty line, including 6.6% of those under age 18 and 9.0% of those age 65 or over.

Education
The Ridgefield School District has five schools: Union Ridge Elementary, South Ridge Elementary, Sunset Ridge Intermediate School, View Ridge Middle School, and Ridgefield High School.

Notable people
William ‘Hap’ Carty, Ridgefield native who helped build U-Haul
Scott Mosier, film producer and podcaster
Richie Sexson, former major league baseball player
Leonard Shoen, founded U-Haul in Ridgefield

References

External links

 
 History of Ridgefield at HistoryLink

 
1909 establishments in Washington (state)
Cities in Clark County, Washington
Cities in Washington (state)
Populated places established in 1909
Portland metropolitan area
Washington (state) populated places on the Columbia River